Scotland has a long history of nuclear research and electricity generation. Nuclear energy consistently accounts for 20-80% of the electric supply in Scotland depending on weather conditions for wind power generation and electricity demand. As of 2022, there is only one remaining operating nuclear power station in Scotland (Torness).

The  Scottish National Party (SNP) government elected in 2007 had a 'no new nuclear power strategy'. This position is at odds with UK government policy which in January 2008 announced the go-ahead for new nuclear power stations to be built across the United Kingdom.  In response, Scotland's then First Minister Alex Salmond commented there was 'no chance' of new nuclear power stations being built in Scotland. The Parliament voted 63–58 to support the policy of opposing new nuclear power stations, taking advantage of a loophole which permits a veto on planning, despite lacking authority over the UK energy policy. Others support nuclear as part of a sustainable, clean energy policy.

Nuclear reactors in Scotland

Power station reactors
Chapelcross, Dumfries and Galloway (Generation ceased 2004)
Hunterston A, North Ayrshire (Generation ceased 1990)
Hunterston B, North Ayrshire - EDF Energy owned AGR (Generation ceased 2022)
Torness, East Lothian - EDF Energy owned AGR

Research reactors
Dounreay
VULCAN (Rolls-Royce Naval Marine) (decommissioned in 1992)
PWR2 (Rolls-Royce Naval Marine) - (shut down 2015)
DMTR - (shut down 1969)
Dounreay Fast Reactor - Fast breeder reactor (shut down 1977)
Prototype fast reactor - (shut down 1994)
 East Kilbride - Scottish Universities Research and Reactor Centre (100 kW Argonaut class reactor deactivated 1995, fully dismantled 2003)

Nuclear-powered vessels

HMNB Clyde (Faslane) is the homeport of the nuclear-powered submarines of the Vanguard and Astute classes:
HMS Vanguard
HMS Victorious
HMS Vigilant
HMS Vengeance
HMS Astute
HMS Ambush
HMS Artful

 seven nuclear-powered submarines were stored at Rosyth Dockyard after decommissioning and the removal of their fuel :
 HMS Churchill
 HMS Dreadnought
 HMS Resolution
 HMS Repulse
 HMS Renown
 HMS Revenge
 HMS Swiftsure

Public opinion
In 2013, a YouGov energy survey concluded that:

By 2020, an IMechE survey found that support for nuclear had increased to 49% in favour.

References

See also
Nuclear power in the United Kingdom
Economy of Scotland
Renewable energy in Scotland
List of Scotland-related topics

 
 
Electricity policy in Scotland